Tremex alchymista is a species of sawfly, native to Hungary and Romania.

References

Siricidae
Insects described in 1886
Hymenoptera of Europe